Gonzalo Peña (born June 3, 1989) is a Spanish television actor. He is best known for his roles in telenovelas such as La malquerida, El hotel de los secretos and Despertar contigo. Also by the commercial for television "Trivago", which had much repercussion through the social networks.

Career 
Born in the capital of the Balearic Islands, Palma de Mallorca, Peña studied theater at the New York Film Academy, then continued his studies in Madrid and later entered the Centro de Educación Artística in Mexico. Peña began his career in television in the telenovela of José Alberto Castro, La malquerida premieres in 2014. In 2015 participated in the telenovela Antes muerta que Lichita production of Rosy Ocampo. In 2016 he entered the cast of the telenovela El hotel de los secretos, in that same year was made known through the commercial "Trivago.com". also was part of the main cast of Despertar contigo as the main villain of the story. In 2017 he cast for the telenovela Enamorándome de Ramón, where he was chosen and shares credits with Esmeralda Pimentel and José Ron.

Legal issues
At the beginning of March 2021, Mexican actress Daniela Berriel accused Peña of being an accomplice to sexual abuse, stating that "the actor was present at the time of the rape, but he did not try to arrest the aggressor or do anything to defend her." As a result of this situation, Peña was temporarily suspended from filming of the telenovela, ¿Qué le pasa a mi familia?, whose transmission had begun on February 22, 2021. Subsequently, on March 22, 2021, the actor was announced fired from the show by the producer Juan Osorio, and was replaced by Fernando Noriega to play his character.

In June 2021, the actor gave a statement, which coincides with that of Daniela Berriel and his whereabouts are currently unknown.

Filmography

References

External links 
 

1989 births
Spanish male telenovela actors
Living people